T. J. Carter (born September 15, 1998) is an American football defensive end for the Los Angeles Rams of the National Football League (NFL). He also spent time with the New Orleans Saints and Pittsburgh Steelers, as well as the Michigan Panthers of the United States Football League (USFL).

Early life and education
Carter was born on September 15, 1998, in Atlanta, Georgia. He attended Whitefield Academy and played football in all four of his years at the school, three as a starter. He played defensive end and offensive tackle, and as a senior was named first-team All-South Region 6-A and first-team All-Cobb County. After graduating, Carter, a two-star recruit, announced his commitment to Kentucky over Wyoming, Samford and Memphis.

As a true freshman at Kentucky in 2016, Carter appeared in 11 games and recorded 11 tackles. As a sophomore, he became starter, appearing in all 13 games while posting 18 tackles and three sacks. In his junior season, Carter returned to a backup role, only starting four games, recording 16 tackles. As a senior, he started 12 matches and recorded a total of 26 tackles, along with two sacks. Carter finished his time at Kentucky with 50 games played, 28 as a starter, and 71 tackles, along with six sacks and 12 . 247Sports ranked him as the 55th best Kentucky player during the Mark Stoops era.

Professional career

Arizona Cardinals
After going unselected in the 2020 NFL Draft, Carter was signed by the Arizona Cardinals as an undrafted free agent. He was released on July 26.

New Orleans Saints
Near the end of August, Carter was signed by the New Orleans Saints, but was later released on September 5 as part of the final roster cuts.

Pittsburgh Steelers
In April 2021, he was signed by the Pittsburgh Steelers. He made only one tackle in preaseason, and was released as part of roster cuts on August 28, 2021.

Michigan Panthers
Carter was selected in the 24th round of the 2022 USFL Draft by the Michigan Panthers, the first defensive tackle selected. He appeared in nine games for the Panthers, missing only one, and posted 24 tackles along with 2.5 sacks.

New Orleans Saints (second stint)
After the USFL season ended, Carter was signed back into the NFL by the New Orleans Saints on August 9, 2022, becoming the fourth Panther to receive an NFL contract. He was released six days later.

Los Angeles Rams
On August 16, 2022, Carter was claimed off waivers by the Los Angeles Rams. Carter was waived at the Rams' final roster cuts, and was afterwards re-signed as a member of the practice squad. He was elevated to the active roster for their Week 13 game against the Seattle Seahawks, and made his NFL debut in the loss, appearing on six snaps. He signed a reserve/futures contract on January 9, 2023.

Carter is not to be confused with the defensive back T. J. Carter, who also played with the Rams in 2022.

References

1998 births
Living people
American football defensive ends
American football defensive tackles
Players of American football from Atlanta
Kentucky Wildcats football players
Arizona Cardinals players
New Orleans Saints players
Pittsburgh Steelers players
Michigan Panthers (2022) players
Los Angeles Rams players